The SS Luray Victory was the seventeenth Victory ship, a new 10,500 ton class ship built during World War II. The California Shipbuilding Company built the ship under the Emergency Shipbuilding program. She was launched on May 11, 1944, and completed on June 26, 1944. The ship’s United States Maritime Commission designation was VC2-S-AP3, hull number 17 (V-17). The SS Luray Victory served in the Pacific Ocean during World War II and was operated by the Black Diamond Steamship Company.

Design 
Victory ships were designed to replace the outdated Liberty Ships. They would last longer and be able to serve the US Navy after World War II. The Victory ships differed from Liberty ships in that they were longer, wider, taller and faster. Victory ships had a thin stack set closer to the superstructure and had a long raised forecastle.

Christening 
The SS Luray Victory was named after the city of Luray, Virginia, one of the 218 Victory ships named after an American city. She was launched at the yards of the California Shipbuilding Corporation in Wilmington, Los Angeles on May 11, 1944. The ship was the seventeenth in a long line of Victory ships, many of which were built at the California Shipbuilding Corporation ("Calship") yard. Her engines were built by the Joshua Hendy iron works in California.

World War II 
During World War II, the SS Luray Victory operated in the Pacific ocean bringing supplies to the US and the Allies. On November 30, 1944, the SS Luray Victory reached New Guinea. The ship was part of convoy GB 720 which carried supplies to forces fighting in the Battle of Leyte and the Battle of Okinawa. From June 26, 1945 to August 15, 1945, she prepared for Operation Downfall, the invasion of the Japanese home islands with exercises at Leyte. When Japan surrendered on 15 August 1945, the exercises were cancelled.

Shipwreck 
In January of 1946, the SS Luray Victory departed Baltimore, Maryland. She was transporting grain to Bremerhaven, Germany as part of the Marshall plan. She crossed the Atlantic Ocean at a speed near her maximum 16.5 knots. In the night of January 30, 1946, the SS Luray Victory entered the Straits of Dover. She had no local maritime pilot on board and was steaming too fast and too close to the shore. The ship ran aground at Goodwin Sands, off the coast of Deal, Kent, England. She hit the sandbank hard and the engines stopped. By 9:00 p.m. the chief engineer had informed the captain that the engines were unable to be repaired. The captain of the ship sent a radio distress signal to the coast guard. At 10:27 p.m. the coast guard found the ship. A rescue could not be made until morning due to a low tide and rough seas.

On the morning of January 31, 1946, the rescue tugs, HMS Lady Bassey and Persia tried to free the ship but the attempt was abandoned due to gale force winds. At 4:00 p.m., the coast guard returned to find the SS Luray Victory breaking up and realised salvage was impossible. The forty-nine crew abandoned the ship, moved to shore by Freddie Upton, the life boat captain.

The top part of the shipwreck was visible for fifty years at 51º-ll'-04N, 001º-31'-62E.

On December 24, 1946, the SS Northeastern Victory was also wrecked on the Goodwin Sands.

See also
 List of Victory ships
 Liberty ship
 Type C1 ship
 Type C2 ship
 Type C3 ship

References

Sources
 Sawyer L. A. and Mitchell W. H. Victory ships and tankers: the history of the ‘Victory’ type cargo ships and of the tankers built in the United States of America during World War II Cornell Maritime Press 1974, 0-87033-182-5.
 Victory Ships United States Maritime Commission. 
 Victory Ships Armed guard website.

Victory ships
Ships built in Los Angeles
United States Merchant Marine
1944 ships
World War II merchant ships of the United States